Pentas is a genus of flowering plants in the family Rubiaceae. The genus is found in tropical and southern Africa, the Comoros, Madagascar, and the Arabian Peninsula.

The plants have hairy green leaves and clusters of flowers in shades of red, white, pink, and purple. Pentas are attractive to butterflies and hummingbirds. Some species are commonly cultivated and can be grown in pots and baskets. Species such as Pentas lanceolata can withstand full sunlight and need little to no care, growing even in locations that are dry and hot.

Species

Pentas angustifolia 
Pentas arvensis 
Pentas caffensis 
Pentas cleistostoma 
Pentas glabrescens 
Pentas herbacea 
Pentas lanceolata  - Egyptian starcluster
Pentas micrantha 
Pentas nervosa 
Pentas pauciflora 
Pentas pubiflora 
Pentas purpurea 
Pentas purseglovei 
Pentas suswaensis 
Pentas tibestica 
Pentas zanzibarica

Image gallery

References

 
Rubiaceae genera